Rengit is a town and an autonomous sub-district in Mukim Sungai Kluang, Batu Pahat District, Johor, Malaysia. Rengit has more than 30 villages and 25 schools.

Geography

The town spans over an area of 6.5 km2. The area of Rengit sub-district is approximately 100.8 square miles or 64,512 hectares and divided into 3 mukims namely the Kampung Bahru, Sungai Punggur and Sungai Kluang District where each mukim is governed by a Chief.

Demographic
The majority ethnics in Rengit are Malay with Chinese as the largest minority.

Languages
Main languages in this town are Bahasa Melayu, Hokkien, Mandarin and English.

Education
SMK Tun Sardon
SMK Rengit / SMK Permata Jaya
S.B.R. Chong Hwa High School
Sekolah Jenis Kebangsaan (C) Chong Hwa Rengit / Chong Hwa Rengit Primary School

Religion
The majority population practice Islam, followed by Chinese folk religion (including Taoism), Buddhism and Christianity.

Place of worship
Masjid Jamek Rengit
Tokong Sembilan Maharaja Dewa (龍引斗母宫), founded in 1912 
Rengit Zheng Long Gong Temple (龍引鎮龍宮)
Rengit Presbyterian Church

Notable residents

 Hasanuddin Mohd Yunus, Politician

Neighbouring towns

References

Towns in Johor
Batu Pahat District